Peritelini is a weevil tribe in the subfamily Entiminae.

Genera 
Afrotroglorrhynchus – Anchitelus – Antispyris – Aparasystates – Aperitelus – Apotmetus – Aragnomus – Asceparnus – Aseneciobius – Caenopsis – Caterectus – Centricnemus – Diaecoderus – Dolichomeira – Dysommatus – Dysticheus – Epactus – Eporeorrhinus – Eucilinus – Eucyllus – Fernandius – Geodercodes – Gymnomorphus – Heisonyx – Heteromeira – Hobarypeithes – Isanates – Isaniris – Lalagetes – Leplospyris – Lepretius – Leptomeira – Leptosphaerotus – Leptospyridus – Liosystates – Mazuranella – Meira – Meirella – Mesoleurus – Mitophorus – Nematocerus – Nemocestes – Neomias – Neoperitelinus – Opseobarypeithes – Oreorrhinus – Oreosecus – Oreosystates – Orthoptochus – Palaepus – Paraptochus – Parasystates – Parasystatiella – Peritelinus – Peritelodes – Peritelopsis – Peritelus – Phoromitus – Platypterocis – Pseudomeira – Rhypodillus – Ripetelus – Seneciobius – Simo –Solariola – Stenoptochus – Stomodes – Stomodesops – Strictoseneciobius – Subleptospyris – Systaniris – Systates – Systatodes – Therapontigonus – Thinoxenus – Thompsonanthus – Thricolepis – Xestorhinus

References 

 Pierotti, H.; Bellò, C.; Alonso-Zarazaga, M.A. 2010: Contribution to the systematic rearrangement of the Palaearctic Peritelini. VI. A synthesis of the Spanish Peritelini (Coleoptera: Curculionidae: Entiminae). Zootaxa, 2376: 1–96.
 Lacordaire, T. 1863: Histoire Naturelle des Insectes. Genera des Coléoptères ou exposé méthodique et critique de tous les genres proposés jusqu'ici dans cet ordre d'insectes. Vol.: 6. Roret. Paris: 637 pp.
 Alonso-Zarazaga, M.A. & Lyal, C.H.C. 1999: A world catalogue of families and genera of Curculionoidea (Insecta: Coleoptera) (excepting Scolytidae and Platypodidae). Entomopraxis. Barcelona: 315 pp.

External links 

Entiminae
Beetle tribes